Cybaeozyga is a monotypic genus of North American araneomorph spiders in the family Cybaeidae containing the single species, Cybaeozyga heterops. It was first described by R. V. Chamberlin & Wilton Ivie in 1937, and was moved to the Cybaeidae in 1967. It has only been found in United States.

References

Cybaeidae
Monotypic Araneomorphae genera
Spiders of the United States